The 1965–66 NBA season was the Bullets' 5th season in the NBA and 3rd season in the city of Baltimore.

Regular season

Season standings

Record vs. opponents

Game log

Playoffs

|- align="center" bgcolor="#ffcccc"
| 1
| March 24
| St. Louis
| L 111–113
| Don Ohl (38)
| Green, Howell (11)
| Johnny Egan (9)
| Baltimore Civic Center3,587
| 0–1
|- align="center" bgcolor="#ffcccc"
| 2
| March 27
| St. Louis
| L 100–105
| Jim Barnes (27)
| Bob Ferry (17)
| Johnny Egan (8)
| Baltimore Civic Center13,104
| 0–2
|- align="center" bgcolor="#ffcccc"
| 3
| March 30
| @ St. Louis
| L 112–121
| Don Ohl (32)
| Bailey Howell (12)
| Johnny Egan (6)
| Kiel Auditorium7,135
| 0–3
|-

Awards and records
Gus Johnson, All-NBA Second Team

References

Washington Wizards seasons
Baltimore
Baltimore Bullets
Baltimore Bullets